Clare Quilty may refer to:
 Clare Quilty, a fictional character in Nabokov's 1955 novel Lolita
 Clare Quilty (group), an American musical group